Bahtiye Musluoğlu (born 1918 — 1999) is a former female tennis player who competed for the Turkey.

She was born in 1918 in Bolu. She started playing tennis while he was studying in Ankara. Musluoğlu was unrivaled in Ankara when he played tennis. Often, she even trained with male tennis players. Mualla Gorodetzky was the undefeated name in women's tennis since the early 1940s. Musluoğlu fought for the final with Gorodetzky in the Turkey Championship for years. Until 1947, Gorodetzky was the winner of Turkey. Musluoğlu won his first Turkey Championship in 1948. In 1950, he was invited to France by the French Tennis Federation. He achieved successful results in international tournaments, which he participated many times in Beirut and Athens. He died in 1999.

She played in singles at the French Open in 1950. She lost to the American player Margaret duPont in the Third Round. She is the first Turkish female tennis player to play a grand slam and win a match.

Career finals

Singles (5–4)

Doubles (10–3)

References

1918 births
1999 deaths
Turkish female tennis players
20th-century Turkish sportswomen